Moon Man or Moonman may refer to:

Entertainment
Moon Man (album), an album by jazz saxophonist Charles Lloyd recorded in 1970 
Moon Man (novel), a 1966 children's book by Tomi Ungerer
Moon Man (2012 film), a film based on Ungerer's book
Moon Man (character), a fictional pulp magazine character who appeared in Ten Detective Aces magazine
"Moon-Man Newfie", a 1972 single by Canadian country music artist Stompin' Tom Connors
"Moon Man", a 2021 song by Young Stoner Life and Young Thug featuring Kid Cudi from the album Slime Language 2
Moon Man (2022 film), a Chinese science fiction comedy

People
Moon Man, the nickname of baseball player Greg Minton
Moon Man, the nickname of writer Ken Ring due to his predictions based on lunar cycles
Moonman, an alias of Ferry Corsten
Eric Moonman (1929–2017), British Labour politician

Other uses
Moon Man No Coast Pale Ale, a beer made by New Glarus Brewing Company
Moonman, the MTV Video Music Award trophy fashioned after astronaut Buzz Aldrin
Moonman, a meme based on Mac Tonight

See also
Man on the Moon (disambiguation)
Man in the Moon (disambiguation)
Moon people (disambiguation)